Luka Savić (born 2 July 1991) is a Serbian retired footballer who played as a midfielder. He primarily played in a central role, but also played in attacking and defensive positions.

Club career
He played for FC Barcelona C in 2006.

In 2012, he joined Persiba Balikpapan before the contract was mutually terminated in May 2013 because of injury problems.

External links
 

Serbian footballers
Living people
1991 births
Persiba Balikpapan players
Liga 1 (Indonesia) players
Association football midfielders
Young Lions FC players
Warriors FC players
Expatriate footballers in Singapore
Singapore Premier League players